Ingatambo (possibly from Quechua inka Inca, tampu inn) is an archaeological site in Peru. It is situated in the Cajamarca Region, Jaén Province, Pomahuaca District.

References 

Archaeological sites in Peru
Archaeological sites in Cajamarca Region